The Pak-China Technical and Vocational Institute at Gwadar is a vocational school which is to be set up by the government of Pakistan in Gwadar at a cost of 943 million Pakistani rupees by March 2016. The Pakistani government has allocated approximately 200 million rupees towards the project, while the remainder will be financed by the government of China.

The project is intended to impart specialized skills to local residents so that they may be employed at the Gwadar Port, which is currently under major expansion as part of the China-Pakistan Economic Corridor.

References

Education in Balochistan, Pakistan
Vocational education in Pakistan
China–Pakistan Economic Corridor